Hawnby is a small crossroads village and civil parish in Rye Dale in the North York Moors National Park, North Yorkshire, England.

History
The village is mentioned twice in the Domesday Book as Halmebi in the Allerton hundred. It was part of the Thornton-le-Moor manor and records local landowners to be  Fredegaest and Ulf. After the Norman invasion, the lands passed to the King and were granted to Robert Malet.

Hawnby became the first village in England to have all of the buildings switch from normal lights to dark-skies friendly lighting in an effort to cut light pollution. Both the North York Moors and Yorkshire Dales National Parks were awarded dark-sky status in 2020.

Governance
The village is in the Thirsk and Malton UK Parliament constituency. It is in the Kirkbymoorside electoral division of North Yorkshire County Council and the Helmsley ward of Ryedale District Council.

Geography
The village sits at the junction of several small roads at the head of two valleys, close to the B1257 road between Oswaldkirk and Stokesley. The nearest settlements are Boltby  to the south-west; Old Byland  to the south and Fangdale Beck  to the north.

The 1851 UK Census recorded the population as 326, which had decreased to 231 at the time of the 1881 UK Census. The 2001 UK Census records the population as 223, of which all of the 127 aged over sixteen years were in employment. There were 94 dwellings, of which 65 were detached. The 2011 Census showed a reduced population of 217.

Religion
There is an Anglican church dedicated to All Saints in the village, built in the 12th century and a Grade II listed Building. It stands on the banks of the River Rye. There is also a Weslyan Chapel founded in 1770, following a visit from John Wesley and rebuilt in 1814. It too is a Grade II Listed Building.

Notable buildings
Arden Hall just to the west of the village is a Grade II Listed Building and is the seat of the Earls of Mexborough. Previously it had been the seat of the Tancred family for at least 300 years. Mary, Queen of Scots stayed here briefly en route to her execution.

In addition to Arden Hall and the two churches, there are 33 other Listed Buildings in and around the area, including Church Bridge and Laskill Bridge.

References

External links

Villages in North Yorkshire
Civil parishes in North Yorkshire